International Journal of Humanities and Arts Computing is a biannual academic journal published in April and October by Edinburgh University Press. It was created in 2007 from the journal History and Computing, which had ceased publication in 2002. It is supported by three institutions: the International Association for History and Computing, the Electronic Cultural Atlas Initiative, and Digital Resources in the Humanities and Arts. The journal covers conceptual or theoretical approaches and case studies  or essays demonstrating how advanced information technologies further scholarly understanding of traditional topics in the arts and  humanities.

External links 
 
 Electronic  Cultural Atlas Initiative
 History and Computing

Edinburgh University Press academic journals
History journals
Publications established in 2007
Biannual journals
English-language journals
Digital humanities